Eran Ganot (born September 8, 1981) is an American college basketball head coach for the University of Hawaii men's team. In 2015–16, his first season as head coach at Hawaii, he earned Big West Coach of the Year accolades.

Early and personal life
Ganot was born in Brooklyn, and raised in his hometown of Tenafly, New Jersey. He is Jewish. His father immigrated to the United States from Romania, and his mother immigrated to the US from Israel. He has a twin brother, named Asaf, a high-end fashion designer, and two sisters, Dani and Betty.

Ganot attended Tenafly High School, graduating in 1999. Playing for his high school basketball team, he was a two-time all-league first-team selection, and was named all-county as a senior.  He now lives in Honolulu, Hawaii, with his wife Barbea and his daughter Zeza.

College
Ganot lettered at Swarthmore College from 1999 to 2003, and was a two-time team captain.  He graduated with a degree in Economics and Sociology/Anthropology in 2003.

Coaching career
Ganot started his coaching career at St. Mary's as a volunteer assistant coach from 2003 to 2006, before joining the Hawaii men's basketball staff as their director of basketball operations. Ganot was promoted to assistant coach after one year, coaching at Hawaii from 2007 to 2010. From 2010 to 2015, he served as assistant coach at St. Mary's in Moraga, California, and was acting head coach for five games in 2013–2014, compiling a 3–2 record.

On April 9, 2015, Ganot was named the head coach at Hawaii, and signed to a three-year contract. At 33 years of age he was the second-youngest head coach in school history, and the 21st head coach ever for the university. His base salary was $225,000.

In 2015–2016, his first season as head coach at Hawaii, he led the Rainbow Warriors to the Big West regular season and tournament titles, the most wins in university history (28), the school's first NCAA Tournament appearance since 2002, and an opening-round upset over California for the teams's first-ever NCAA Tournament win. He earned Big West Coach of the Year accolades. He also received the CollegeInsider.com's Joe B. Hall Award, awarded to the top first-year head coach, as well as the Red Auerbach College Coach of the Year Award, selected by members of the Jewish Coaches Association as the top Jewish head basketball college coach.

In September 2016 the university gave him a two-year contract extension.

In November 2019, days before the Rainbow Warriors' season opener, Ganot took a leave of absence to deal with an unspecified medical issue. First year assistant Chris Gerlufsen served as acting head coach in his absence. Ganot returned to coaching on December 29, in a 91–51 win over Maine.

Ganot received a three-year contract extension prior to the 2022–23 season.

Head coaching record

Notes

References

External links
 
 Hawaii profile
 Saint Mary's profile

1981 births
Living people
American men's basketball coaches
American men's basketball players
American people of Israeli descent
American people of Romanian descent
Basketball coaches from New Jersey
College men's basketball head coaches in the United States
Hawaii Rainbow Warriors basketball coaches
People from Tenafly, New Jersey
Sportspeople from Bergen County, New Jersey
Sportspeople from Brooklyn
Basketball players from New York City
Saint Mary's Gaels men's basketball coaches
Swarthmore Garnet Tide men's basketball players
Tenafly High School alumni